Lovett Shaizer Purnell (born April 7, 1972), is a former American football tight end in the National Football League (NFL). Purnell attended Seaford High but graduated from Valley Forge Military Academy and College in Wayne, Pennsylvania before attending West Virginia University. After graduating from WVU, he was selected in the 7th round (216th overall) by the New England Patriots in the 1996 NFL Draft. A member of the Patriots from 1996–1998 and Baltimore Ravens in 1999, Purnell tallied 19 career receptions for 159 yards and 5 touchdowns in 36 career games (7 starts).

"I'm going to try to be Lovett Purnell and go out there and play the best way I can."  

As a WVU Mountaineer, Purnell tallied 78 catches, 1161 yards and ten scores. He was named MVP of the 1995 season, which led to his seventh-round selection in the NFL Draft by New England. During four NFL seasons with the Patriots and Baltimore Ravens, Purnell played in 36 games, catching 19 passes for 159 yards and five touchdowns.

After the 1999 season with the Baltimore Ravens, Purnell quietly stepped away from on-field competition. Post-NFL, Lovett found tremendous success in the telecommunication industry in Tampa, FL where he currently resides. Whether on the field, or in the corporate world, Lovett has always had the reputation of being an all-around nice guy and team player.

The Delaware Sports Museum and Hall of Fame inducted Purnell in 2007.

References

External links
 Just Sports Stats

1972 births
Living people
American football tight ends
Baltimore Ravens players
Chicago Enforcers players
New England Patriots players
West Virginia Mountaineers football players
People from Seaford, Delaware
Players of American football from Delaware
Valley Forge Military Academy Trojans football players